Mordellistena zuuncharaensis is a beetle in the genus Mordellistena of the family Mordellidae. It was described in 1965 by Ermisch. It is known from Mongolia.

References

zuuncharaensis
Beetles described in 1965